GagaOOLala is a Taiwan-based worldwide subscription video on demand service, specializing in uncensored LGBT-related films, LGBT made-for television films and contemporary LGBT television drama series. It has partnered with Japanese-based Line TV, initially in Thailand, and then across Asia, to provide the service with GagaOOLala-made TV series. GagaOOLala is owned by Portico Media Co. Ltd; which also served cable TV channels for Taiwan cable TV provider along with Chunghwa Telecom's MOD platform. 

The service launched in March 2017, initially only on Taiwan, before rolling out to the 10 ASEAN nations in South East Asia in 2017, Hong Kong and Macau in 2018 and the rest of Asia in 2019. The service became available globally, except in mainland China and North Korea, in May 2020.

It is the first  LGBT-focused OTT platform in Asia. Its catalog includes feature films, shorts, documentaries, series and its own original content.

Name
In a 2019 interview, Jay Lin, CEO of GagaOOLala, revealed the story behind the name: "Lala’ and ‘gaga’ are slang terms for lesbian and gay in Chinese. The ‘oo’ comes from the French ‘ou’ which means ‘or’".

History
Portico Media is one of the co-founders of the Taiwan International Queer Film Festival and was in charge of the organization of the festival during its first three editions (2014, 2015, 2016). However, Jay Lin still found the film festival experience limiting regarding the availability of LGBT content for Asian audiences and decided to establish Asia's first LGBT-streaming platform, GagaOOLala. GagaOOLala was first launched in Taiwan on November 11, 2016. Its first expansion into the Asian market took place with the launch in the 10 countries that conform ASEAN in Southeast Asia on April 28, 2017. On May 13, 2018, GagaOOLala was launched in Hong Kong and Macau. On June 14, 2019, the streaming service started operations in all of South Asia. The company made the announcement together with a distribution tie-in with KASHISH Mumbai International Queer Film Festival. On May 15, 2020, GagaOOLala became available globally.

Activism
On October 28, 2016, GagaOOLala celebrated the first ever Queermosa Gala, an award ceremony "to bring broad media visibility to the people and companies working hard to have LGBT voices heard in Taiwan." The ceremony was supported by GLAAD. Among the first year winner's were television host Dee Hsu, singer A-Mei and rights activist Chi Chia-wei.

During the Taipei Pride celebrations of 2018, GagaOOLala, GagaTai and LalaTai organized together with the Singaporean fashion photographer Leslie Kee the photography exhibition Out in Taiwan. The project was composed of black-and-white portraits of LGBTQ people living in Taiwan in order to humanize the LGBT community.

GagaOOLala is also one of the five founding members of the Marriage Equality Coalition Taiwan, one of the main LGBT rights group in Taiwan. The organization was one of the main driving forces behind the passing of the same-sex marriage law in Taiwan on May 17, 2019, making it the first country in Asia.

Content
The platform currently hosts more than 1,000 LGBT titles including feature films, shorts, documentaries and series from all over the world, but with a focus on Asian queer cinema. It is the home for the filmography of international queer directors such as Simon Chung, Zero Chou, Scud, Marco Berger or Joselito Altarejos, and the distributor in Asia of international hit titles like Blue is the Warmest Color, Moonlight, Front Cover or Weekend.

Original Content

GagaOOLala has produced original content since its launching date. In 2016, they produced Ting-Chun Huang short film Sodom's Cat, one of the first R-rated queer stories from the island's filmography. The film was selected at that year's Outfest, Frameline and nominated to the Iris Prize.

The next year, 2017, GagaOOLala produced its first feature film, Tale of the Lost Boys, by Filipino director Joselito Altarejos. The film, a Taiwanese-Filipino cross-cultural story that tackles issues of sexuality and self-identity, was awarded Best Picture, Best Screenplay, Best Editing and Best Office Award at Sinag Maynila Film Festival. That same year, the platform also commissioned its first original series Queer Taiwan, an episodic documentary about the circumstances that have made of Taiwan a beacon for LGBT rights in Asia and, eventually, the first country in the continent to legalize same-sex marriage. The first season focused on four main topics in Taiwan: religion and the marriage equality movement, the drag culture, sex and disability, and surrogacy.

In 2018, Queer Taiwan was renewed for a second season and re-branded as Queer Asia. The move to four new different territories (Hong Kong, the Philippines, Japan and Vietnam), "to highlight the steep cultural differences in Asia within the LGBT community".

GOL STUDIOS

In March 2019, GagaOOLala launched GOL STUDIOS, a crowd-sourcing platform to assist in the production and distribution of LGBT content around the world. GOL STUDIOS is open to all filmmakers, where they can upload any projects they are working on, request resources, and connect with other film professionals. The platform will bring more original content into GagaOOLala. In its first year, GOL STUDIOS commissioned 11 projects that will be released in 2020. Among the selected projects are Hong Kong independent film director Kit Hung's latest project Forever 17, a Zero Chou's new film and series, and the surrogacy-themed documentary Made in Boise, that will premiere in the second half of 2019 at Independent Lens on PBS.

References

External links 
 GagaOOLala official site
 GOL STUDIOS official site

Video on demand
LGBT film awards